Kälviä is a former municipality of Finland. Kälviä was consolidated with the city of Kokkola on Jan 1, 2009.

It is located in the province of Western Finland and is part of the Central Ostrobothnia region. The population density was 6.6 inhabitants per square kilometer (17.1/mi²).

The former municipality was unilingually Finnish.

Villages
Honkimaa, Jatkojoki, Jokikylä, Karhulahti, Kleemola, Kälviä, Miekkoja, Nissi, Passoja, Peitso, Peltokorpi, Porkola, Riippa, Ridankylä, Rimpilä, Ruotsalo, Vuollet, Välikylä, Rita.

Distances:
Kokkola center: 16 km
Oulu: 161 km
Vaasa: 125 km
Helsinki: 419 km
Tampere: 270 km
Turku: 386 km

Notable individuals 
 Asser Stenbäck, doctor and politician
 Esa Riippa, print-maker
 Ilkka Uusitalo, diplomat
 Kauno Kleemola, politician
 Lars Sonck, architect
 Lucina Hagman, teacher and Member of the Parliament of Finland
 Matti Korkiala, pop singer
 Odert W. Renell, architect
 Raimo Kero, singer
 Viljo Elomaa, athlete
 Väinö Siirilä, playwright

External links 

Populated places disestablished in 2009
2009 disestablishments in Finland
Former municipalities of Finland
Kokkola